Gerard Amyatt Simpson (30 March 1886 – 22 February 1957) was a Scottish-born cricketer whose four-match first-class career spanned from 1911 to 1931.

Born in Trinity, Edinburgh, Simpson emigrated to Argentina as a young man, becoming one of the many British expatriate workers in South America at the time. He made his debut in Argentine cricket's annual "North v South"  match during the 1906–07 season, opening the batting for the North in both innings, alongside Lancastrian Harold Garnett. When a Marylebone Cricket Club (MCC) team toured Argentina during the 1911–12 season, Simpson played a single first-class match for the Argentine national side. He came in fifth in Argentina's first innings, scoring 26 runs, and was promoted to third in the second innings, behind openers Neville Jackson and Evelyn Toulmin, scoring another 10 runs before being run out. That match, played at the Hurlingham Club Ground, was the first of three Argentina–MCC fixtures played on the tour.

During the First World War, Simpson briefly returned to Britain, where he served as a second lieutenant in the Royal Field Artillery. He continued playing in North v South fixtures in Argentina either side of the war, and also appeared for Rosario Athletic Club in the Argentine Cricket Championship. Simpson also appeared twice more for the Argentine national side during the 1921–22 season, when Brazil toured the country. While in England in 1922, he appeared in a single match for the Kent County Cricket Club's second XI, which at the time played in the Minor Counties Championship (the Second XI Championship not being established until 1959). Simpson's last recorded match in Argentina came during the 1922–23 season. He did, however, represent an "Anglo-Argentine XI" in England in 1926, in a match against the MCC at Lord's.

During the 1929 season, aged 43, Simpson played two County Championship matches for Kent – one against Yorkshire at Bramall Lane and one against Lancashire at Old Trafford. There was consequently a gap of 17 years, three months, and 14 days between his first and second first-class appearances. Simpson's fourth and final first-class match came two seasons later, against Lancashire in the 1931 County Championship, by which time he was 45 years old. He was at that stage a regular for Kent's second XI, and continued playing for them after the Second World War, despite having turned 60 during the war. Overall, Simpson played 138 Minor Counties Championship matches for the Kent Second XI, with his final match coming against Devon in August 1949, when he was 63. He died in Chartham in February 1957, aged 70.

References

1886 births
1957 deaths
Argentine cricketers
Kent cricketers
Royal Field Artillery officers
Scottish cricketers
Scottish expatriate sportspeople in Argentina
Cricketers from Edinburgh
British Army personnel of World War I
Military personnel from Edinburgh